Sulaiman Adebola Adegunwa OFR, is a Nigerian businessman, philanthropist, and former chairman of Sterling Bank Plc. He is the founder and chief executive officer of Essay Holdings Limited; Parent Company of Rite Foods Limited. 
He is a member of the Board of directors of Thai Farm International Limited, a Nigeria-based company that focus on the production and processing of cassava. He is the founder of Sulaimon College of Education, Ososa, Ogun State, Nigeria.

Career
Adegunwa hold doctorate degree honoris causa from the Lagos State University and Olabisi Onabanjo University.
On 22 December 2005, he was appointed the executive director of Sterling Bank Plc, a position he held until July 2014.
In 2006, he was conferred with a national honor of the Officer of the order of Nigeria(OON) by chief Olusegun Obasanjo the former President of Nigeria.

References

People from Ogun State
Living people
Year of birth missing (living people)
Nigerian food company founders
Yoruba businesspeople
Nigerian chairpersons of corporations
Officers of the Order of the Federal Republic